Hypopta ambigua is a moth in the family Cossidae. It is found in Paraguay.

References

External links 
Natural History Museum Lepidoptera generic names catalog

Hypopta
Moths described in 1818